A by-election was held in the state electoral district of Cabramatta on 22 October 1994. The by-election was triggered by the murder of anti-drugs and anti-crime campaigner John Newman. The election was held only five months before the 1995 election.

Dates

Results

John Newman was murdered.The Liberal Party did not nominate a candidate.

See also
Electoral results for the district of Cabramatta
List of New South Wales state by-elections

References

Cabramatta
New South Wales state by-elections
1990s in New South Wales
October 1994 events in Australia